Angélica Claro Canteros (born July 7, 1938), known by the penname Coral Aguirre, is a playwright, musician, and professor of literature and acting. Originally from Argentina, she is a nationalized Mexican citizen. She has been a member of the Bahía Blanca Symphony Orchestra in Argentina and the Turin Opera Orchestra in Italy. She has published articles and essays on theatrical, literary, historical, and anthropological subjects in countries such as Argentina, Cuba, the United States, and Mexico.

Biography
Angélica Claro Canteros was born in Bahía Blanca, Argentina on July 7, 1938. Her father registered her given name as Angélica, despite her mother's wishes that she be named Coral after her grandmother. In childhood, she was attracted to the arts by the influence of her mother and her magazines. She studied violin, piano, and viola, an instrument that she played in the Bahía Blanca Symphony Orchestra. She was introduced to theater during a dramatic art class at the same school where she learned viola. This allowed her to obtain a scholarship to study in Buenos Aires.

In 1964 she began a romantic relationship with Dardo Aguirre, who played violin in the same orchestra, and whose surname she adopted to create her pseudonym as a writer. Together they presided over Teatro Alianza from 1966 to 1978, a group that presented collective creations exposing political problems of the time. In 1977 they presented Coral's first play, Silencio-hospital. During the performance, several members of the troupe were arrested, including Coral and Dardo. Coral was imprisoned for a month, during which she was subjected to a mock execution. It was thanks to pressure from the art community and newspapers that she and Dardo regained their freedom, while others were never heard from again.

They spent time in exile in Europe, and in 1981 they returned to Argentina, where they remained in hiding for a time. The threats they experienced there led them to migrate to Mexico. She later reflected,

She lived in Mexico City for five years, and in 1994 she moved to Monterrey, Nuevo León to work at Televisa's drama school. Her pedagogical vocation led her to teach Greco-Latin literature at the Autonomous University of Nuevo León (UANL), the same university where she serves as coordinator of the Theater School. Aguirre continued to write and direct theater in Monterrey, presenting plays such as Juegos a la hora de la siesta, El atentado, and Yepeto y Ardiente paciencia. She mainly writes articles and essays of a theatrical, literary, historical, and anthropological nature. Her works are published in anthologies, cultural weeklies, and culture magazines. She is also the general director and writer for Levadura magazine, a laboratory-type publication for cultural, political, and social reflection. She also taught the Semiotics of the Show module within the Theater Criticism program organized by the Council for Culture and the Arts of Nuevo León (CONARTE).

In 2020, she served as a juror for the Alfonso Reyes International Prize.

In 2021, she was selected as coordinator of the Writers Center of Nuevo León, a CONARTE program to stimulate and promote the development of literary creation.

Awards
 Argentine National Playwright Award, 1987
 Film Screenplay Award from UNAM and the Institute of the Mexican Revolution, 1993
 Argentine National Playwright Award, 1997
 Finalist for the Nuevo León Literature Award, 2003
 Nuevo León Literature Award, 2007

 UANL Arts Award, 2009
 Theater XXI Award, 2012
 UANL Civil College Recognition of Artistic Merit, 2020

Works
 La Cruz en el espejo, dramatic piece in two acts, 1988
 Silencio-hospital, 1988
 Teatro breve nuevoleonés, for theater students and workshops, 1999
 Apuntes para un diagnóstico cultural del sur de Nuevo León, 2000
 Los niños de Nuevo León y el fuego de Prometeo, 2001
 Contraseña: nueva dramaturgia regiomontana, 2003
 Teatro del Norte 4, 2003
 Larga distancia, 2004
 La Pasión del diablo: una visión enamorada, 2004
 Andar por la tierra, 2011

References

1938 births
21st-century Mexican women writers
21st-century Mexican writers
Academic staff of the Autonomous University of Nuevo León
Living people
Mexican dramatists and playwrights
Mexican women dramatists and playwrights
Violists
Women violists
Writers from Monterrey
21st-century pseudonymous writers
Pseudonymous women writers